Kelly Eisenhour (April 17, 1960, Tucscon, Arizona) is a jazz vocalist.  Her album Seek and Find which also featured Bob Mintzer went high on the jazz charts.  She has also co-operated in productions with Gladys Knight, such as the 2006 Grammy award-winning One Voice. She has also toured as guest soloist with the Boston Pops Orchestra conducted by Keith Lockhart.

Eisenhour is a graduate of Berklee College of Music and was the head of the vocal jazz program at Brigham Young University from 2005-2008.  She teaches at Green River Community College in Auburn, Washington.

Discography
 Now You Know
 Seek and Find (Blujazz, 2007)

References

Sources
Official site

Living people
Berklee College of Music alumni
Brigham Young University faculty
Year of birth missing (living people)